McQuaid is a surname of Irish origin, from the County Monaghan and other surrounding areas in Ulster. It originated as a variation of McCaul, and similar spellings include McQuade and McQuaide. Notable people with the surname include:

Adam McQuaid (born 1986), Canadian professional hockey player
Ann McQuaid (born 1951), Irish canoer
Bernard John McQuaid (1823–1909), American Roman Catholic bishop
Brad McQuaid (1969–2019), American computer game designer
Dan McQuaid (born 1960), American professional football player
Glenn McQuaid (born 1972/1973), Irish film director
Herb McQuaid (1899–1966), American baseball pitcher
Jack McQuaid (1859–1895), American baseball player and umpire
Jim McQuaid (1920–1991), Irish racing cyclist, coach, and manager
John McQuaid, multiple people including
John McQuaid (cyclist) (born 1960), Irish cyclist
John A. McQuaid, Canadian jurist
John Charles McQuaid (1895–1973), Irish Roman Catholic archbishop
Kieron McQuaid (born 1950), former Irish cyclist
Mart McQuaid (1861–1928), professional baseball player
Matt McQuaid (born 1996), American professional basketball player
Melanie McQuaid (born 1973), Canadian triathlete
Melvin McQuaid (1911–2001), Canadian politician
Michelle McQuaid (born 1991), Canadian curler
Oliver McQuaid (born 1954), Irish former cyclist
Paddy McQuaid, Irish road racing cyclist
Pat McQuaid (born 1949), Irish racing cyclist
Paul McQuaid, Irish cyclist
Peter McQuaid, Canadian politician
Phyllis W. McQuaid (born 1928), American politician
Sarah McQuaid (born 1966), Spanish-born British singer, songwriter and guitarist
Tommy McQuaid (1936–1981), Irish footballer
Ululani McQuaid (1890–1970), Hawaiian opera singer and civic leader

See also
McCaul
McQuaide
McQuade
McQuaid Jesuit High School, Rochester, New York, USA
Quaid (surname)